Ľuboš Kondis (born 29 June 1976) is a Slovak cyclist. He competed in the men's cross-country mountain biking event at the 2004 Summer Olympics.

References

External links
 

1976 births
Living people
Slovak male cyclists
Olympic cyclists of Slovakia
Cyclists at the 2004 Summer Olympics
Sportspeople from Humenné